The 2022 Columbia Lions football team represented Columbia University as a member of the Ivy League during the 2022 NCAA Division I FCS football season. The team was led by seventh-year head coach Al Bagnoli and played its home games at Robert K. Kraft Field at Lawrence A. Wien Stadium.

Previous season

The Lions finished the 2021 season with a record of 7–3, 3–4 Ivy League play to finish in fifth place.

Schedule

Game summaries

at Marist

at Georgetown

Princeton

Wagner

at Penn

Dartmouth

Yale

at Harvard

at Brown

Cornell

References

Columbia
Columbia Lions football seasons
Columbia Lions football